Kurgan is a rural locality (a settlement) and the administrative center of Ust-Urolskoye Rural Settlement, Cherdynsky District, Perm Krai, Russia. The population was 505 as of 2010. There are 9 streets.

Geography 
Kurgan is located 127 km southwest of Cherdyn (the district's administrative centre) by road. Shishigino is the nearest rural locality.

References 

Rural localities in Cherdynsky District